XHRTP-FM is a radio station on 90.7 FM in San Martín Texmelucan, Puebla, Mexico. It is owned by Grupo Radiorama and known as La Poderosa with a regional Mexican format.

History
XERTP-AM 1600 received its concession on January 4, 1971, soon moving to 1540. It was owned by Radio Texmelucan, S.A.

In January 2009, XERTP moved to 880 kHz and cut its power from 2.5 kW to 1 kW during the day.

XERTP moved to FM in 2010.

Between 2019 and January 2020, the station was operated by Grupo Siete Comunicación as Crystal FM. The operating contract ended in late January 2020 and Radiorama returned to operating XHRTP.

References

External links
La Poderosa 90.7 Facebook

1971 establishments in Mexico
Grupo Radiorama
Radio stations established in 1971
Radio stations in Puebla
Regional Mexican radio stations
Spanish-language radio stations